The Flyox I is an unmanned aerial vehicle flying boat, twin-engine, high-wing amphibious aircraft able to land and take off from short unpaved airstrips & water.

A first prototype was built and flown by Barcelona-based Singular Aircraft in 2015, with a second prototype flying in July 2020.

Four main configurations allow agricultural, firefighting, surveillance and general cargo capability, by itself or in fleet configuration, either by day and night operation.

In its aerial firefighting configuration can scoop 1,800 litres of water and drop it over forest fires.

When equipped with ferry tanks it has a range of 3,000 nmi, or can loiter for more than 30 hrs on surveillance missions.

Specifications (Flyox I)

See also

Notes

References

External links
 Singular Aircraft Official Website

SA 03
Unmanned aerial vehicles of Spain
Flying boats
Amphibious aircraft
Parasol-wing aircraft
V-tail aircraft
Twin piston-engined tractor aircraft
Aircraft first flown in 2015